Wola Naropińska  is a village in the administrative district of Gmina Żelechlinek, within Tomaszów Mazowiecki County, Łódź Voivodeship, in central Poland.

The village has a population of 70.

References

Villages in Tomaszów Mazowiecki County